The 2011 World Youth Championships in Athletics were the seventh edition of the World Youth Championships in Athletics. They were held in Lille Métropole, France, with stadium-based events at Stadium Lille-Métropole in Villeneuve d'Ascq, on 6–10 July 2011. Eligible athletes were aged 16 or 17 on 31 December 2011 (born in 1994 or 1995). The event had record participation levels, with 1375 athletes (757 boys/618 girls) from 173 countries entering the tournament.

Over the five-day competition, forty track and field events were contested (20 for boys and 20 for girls). A total of five world youth best marks were set in Lille. New Zealand's Jacko Gill won the shot put by four metres, improving his own youth best to 24.35 m. Jake Stein collected a record 6491 points in the octathlon, while Leonard Kirwa Kosencha of Kenya ran a world youth best of 1:44.08 minutes for the 800 metres. The United States boys and Jamaican girls ran record times to win their respective medley relay events. Four further championship records were also broken at the competition.

The United States topped the medals table (six golds and 16 in total), closely followed by Kenya, which took five golds and 14 altogether from the middle- and long-distance races. Jamaica came third, winning most of its medals in the sprints and jumps, although Fedrick Dacres made history by taking the country's first ever gold in the discus throw. The same top-three order occurred in the points table, which took into account placings in the top eight of each event.

Medal summary

Boys

Girls

Medal table

All Information taken from IAAF's website.

Participating nations 

 (29)
 (12)
 (15)

 (20)

 (42)

 (12)

 (9)

 (host)

 (27) 
 (24)

 (19)

 (39)

 (15)

 (8)

 (1)

 (1)

 (10)

 (7)

 (19)

 (40)

References 

Session reports
Martin, Dave (2011-07-06). Sprint hurdler Zbaren confirms world leader status - Lille 2011 - Day 1, Morning report. IAAF. Retrieved on 2011-08-01.
Martin, Dave (2011-07-06). Historic firsts for Ethiopia and Jamaica, five world Youth leads the highlights in Lille – Day 1, Evening Report. IAAF. Retrieved on 2011-08-01.
Martin, Dave (2011-07-07). Gill looking to improve World best in Shot Put final – Lille 2011 - Day 2, Morning report. IAAF. Retrieved on 2011-08-01.
Martin, Dave (2011-07-07). World Youth bests by Gill and Stein in – Lille 2011 – Day 2, Evening Report. IAAF. Retrieved on 2011-08-01.
Martin, Dave (2011-07-08). Tanui rises to No. 4 youth all-time in 2000m Steeplechase - Lille 2011 - Day 3, Morning report. IAAF. Retrieved on 2011-08-01.
Martin, Dave (2011-07-08). Hall and Miller fulfill favourites’ roles with 400m triumphs - Lille 2011 - Day 3, Evening report. IAAF. Retrieved on 2011-08-01.
Martin, Dave (2011-07-09). In dramatic finish, Parshin takes 10,000m Race Walk title - Lille 2011 - Day 4, Morning report. IAAF. Retrieved on 2011-08-01.
Martin, Dave (2011-07-09). Kosencha blazes 1:44.08 World Youth best - Lille 2011 - Day 4, Evening report. IAAF. Retrieved on 2011-08-01.
Martin, Dave (2011-07-10). Sitonik’s impressive 3000m caps the action as curtain draws on World Youth champs - Lille 2011 - Day 5 report. IAAF. Retrieved on 2011-08-01.

External links
 Official results
Official competition website
Official 2011 World Youth Championships website at IAAF

 
IAAF World Youth Championships in Athletics
World Youth Championships in Athletics
2011 World Youth Championships in Athletics
World Youth Championships in Athletics